S-adenosylhomocysteine hydrolase may refer to:
 Adenosylhomocysteinase, an enzyme
 Adenosylhomocysteine nucleosidase, an enzyme